TEL or Tel may refer to:

Businesses and organisations
 Tokyo Electron, a semiconductor equipment manufacturer 
 TE Connectivity, a technology company, NYSE stock ticker TEL
 The European Library, an Internet service

Places
 Tel, Azerbaijan
 Tel River, in Orissa, India
 Tel, a component of Hebrew placenames meaning 'hill'

Science and technology
 Technology-Enhanced Learning
 Tetraethyllead, a gasoline additive to make leaded gasoline
 ETV6, previously known as TEL, a gene
 Transporter erector launcher, a mobile missile launch platform
 Tolman electronic parameter, a property of ligands
 tel, a URI scheme for telephone numbers
 .tel, an internet top-level domain
 tel, a parameter in the hCard microformat

Other uses
 Tell (archaeology), or tel, a type of archaeological mound created by human occupation
 Test of Economic Literacy, a standardized test of economics 
 Thomson–East Coast MRT line, a mass rapid transit line in Singapore
 Telescopium, a minor constellation in the southern celestial hemisphere
 Telugu language, ISO 639-2/3 language code tel

See also
Tell (disambiguation)
El Tel, nickname for Terry Venables, English football manager